Melese hampsoni is a moth of the family Erebidae first described by Walter Rothschild in 1909. It is found in Guyana, Brazil, Suriname, Peru, French Guiana and Ecuador.

References

Moths described in 1909
Melese